Fredericton International Airport  is an airport in Lincoln, New Brunswick, Canada,  southeast of Fredericton.

The airport is classified as an international airport by Transport Canada and is staffed by the Canada Border Services Agency (CBSA). CBSA officers at this airport can handle aircraft with no more than 55 passengers or 140 if offloaded in stages.

Part of the National Airports System, the airport is owned by Transport Canada and operated by the Greater Fredericton Airport Authority.

The airport has two runways and is the second-busiest airport in New Brunswick in terms of passenger levels, after the Greater Moncton International Airport. In 2016 the airport handled 377,977 passengers and in 2008 the airport went from 34,078 aircraft movements to 73,330, an increase of 115%, prompting Nav Canada to provide a control tower in 2009/2010. In 2009 the airport saw the number of movements rise by 44.8% to 106,178, making it the 19th-busiest in Canada and the only one in the top twenty without air traffic control during the year.

Fredericton was designated an international airport in 2007 by Transport Canada.

The airport spent $30 million to expand the terminal size by 50% to improve energy efficiency, add more ticket counters, washroom and seating. The expansion began in mid summer of 2018 and construction lasted 30 months.

Airlines and destinations

Statistics

Annual traffic

Facilities

Built from 1949 to 1951, the airport terminal consists of a 5 storey control tower flanked by a single storey departure and arrival wings. Additions were completed from 2004 to 2006 and 2009.

The airport has its own fire suppression (two ARFF and tanker) to handle aircraft-related emergency calls. Mutual assistance provided by Fredericton, Oromocto and CFB Gagetown.

References

External links

 Air traffic controllers return to Fredericton

Certified airports in New Brunswick
Transport in Fredericton
Buildings and structures in Fredericton
National Airports System